Cedikope is rural community in the Kwahu Afram Plains North District in the Eastern Region in Ghana.

Institutions 

 Cedikope Community Health Planning and Services (CHPS)

References 

Eastern Region (Ghana)
Communities in Ghana